Kyger may refer to:

 Kyger, Ohio, unincorporated community in Ohio (USA)
 Kyger Creek, a stream of water nearby Kyger, Ohio

 Joanne Kyger, American poet
 Kyger Creek Power Plant, coal-fired power station located in Ohio (USA)
 Kyger Creek High School, former public high school in Ohio (USA)